The following list includes notable individuals who were born or have lived in Indore, India, or its surrounding towns and areas.

Rulers, Politicians and Nationalists 
 Devi Ahilya Bai Holkar, most noted ruler of Holkar State; built numerous temples, wells and dharamshalas all over India; spent most of her life in Maheshwar, then capital of the Holkars, situated on the banks of the Narmada and is said to have visited Indore only twice in her lifetime; her name is synonymous with Indore and the university and airport are named after her
 Maharaja Yashwantrao Holkar, key figure in Maratha history; galvanized several years of resistance against the British Empire; called the Napoleon of India
 Yeshwantrao Holkar II (born 1908), the Maharaja of Indore belonging to the Holkar dynasty of the Marathas; born in Indore
 Field Marshal Sam Bahadur Manekshaw, Commandant of the Infantry School, Mhow during the 1950s
 Field Marshal K. M. Cariappa, first Indian Commander-in-Chief of the Indian Army; studied at Daly College, Indore
 General K. Sundarji, Commandant of the College of Combat, Mhow (now known as Army War College) during the early 1980s
 Air Chief Marshal Shashindra Pal Tyagi, Chief of the Air Staff of the Indian Air Force, 2004–2007
 Jyotiraditya Scindia, Indian Politician, former President of MPCA, Hereditary Patron of Daly College, Indore 
 Sumitra Mahajan, Bharatiya Janata Party (BJP) Leader and MP; Member of Parliament from Indore Lok Sabha constituency since 1989 and lok sabha speaker
 Digvijay Singh, Indian politician; former Chief Minister of Madhya Pradesh; senior leader of the Indian National Congress political party; studied at Daly College in Indore; alumnus of Shri Govindram Seksaria Institute of Technology and Science, Indore
 Kailash Vijayvargiya - A heavyweight leader of Indore BJP, currently serving as General Secretary of the Bharatiya Janata Party (BJP)
 Satyanarayan Patel, a senior leader of Indian National Congress party
 Afroz Ahmad is member in Government Of Indian appointed by Prime Minister of India
 Homi F. Daji, member of the 3rd Lok Sabha of India. He represented the Indore constituency of Madhya Pradesh and was a member of the Communist Party of India.
 Ramesh Mendola, Bharatiya Janata Party (BJP) Leader and MLA; Member of Legislative Assembly from Indore-2 (Vidhan Sabha constituency) since 2008
 Ajit Jogi, first Chief Minister of Chhattisgarh; District Magistrate of Indore in the 1980s
 Prabhash Joshi, journalist, editor in chief of Jansatta (The Indian Express group)
 Guru Radha Kishan, Swatantrata Sangram Sainik, fought for the economic deprivation for the poor and issues of social deprivation
 Prakash Chandra Sethi, Indian National Congress politician; Chief Minister of Madhya Pradesh; Member of Parliament from Indore Lok Sabha constituency (1984-1989); served in a number of positions in the Centre, including Home Minister, Defence Minister, Minister of External Affairs, Finance Minister, Railways, and Housing and Development
 Rajesh Agarwal, Deputy Mayor of London for Business present deputy Mayor of London for business, born in indore
 Dr. Bhimrao Ambedkar Chairperson of Drafting Committee of Indian Constitution Social reformer,  Born in Mhow, District of Indore

Artists, writers and literary figures
 Ustaad Amir Khan (born 15-08-1912), A celebrated Hindustani classical vocalist; referred to his unique style of khyal singing as "Indore Gharana"; born in Indore
 Bhalu Mondhe (born 15-03-1944) A Padma Shri awardee photographer, artist and environmentalist who played an important role in restoring the Sirpur Lake, an important bird habitat and a Ramsar site.
 Celina Jaitley, (born 24-11-1981) An Indian actress born in Shimla who mostly appears in Bollywood films; her parents live in the army town of Mhow in the Indore district.
 Digvijay Bhonsale, (born 31-03-1989) Rock/Metal Musician, Lead Vocalist/Guitarist of Nicotine, Metal band from Indore; studied at Daly College, Indore and Cardiff Metropolitan University, UK
 Hussain Haidry, Poet, writer and lyricist; born and brought up in Indore; studied at Indian Institute of Management Indore and Government Arts and Commerce College, Indore
 Johnny Walker, Renowned comedy actor; born in Indore
 Kiran Kumar, Mumbai-based Kashmiri Indian actor; studied at Daly College, Indore
 Kishore Kumar, playback singer and actor; belonged to Khandwa; studied at the Indore Christian College and used to stay in the hostel
 Kumar Pallana, Hollywood and Bollywood film actor, juggler, balance artist, teacher, yogi (1918 - 2013).
 Kunwar Amarjeet Singh, hip-hop and contemporary style dancer; played lead role in Dil Dosti Dance
 Lata Mangeshkar, playback singer; born in Indore to Pandit Dinanath Mangeshkar
 Mahadevi Varma, Hindi poet; freedom fighter; was married to Dr Swarup Narain Varma in Indore
 Meghdeep Bose, Indian music composer, producer, arranger and singer
 M.F. Husain, painter; spent his struggling years in Indore.
 Palak Muchhal, Indian playback singer; born and brought up in Indore
 Palash Muchhal, Musical composer; born and brought up in Indore
 Praveen Morchhale, Filmmaker, educated in Indore
 Puru Dadheech, Padma Shri, Kathak scholar, Dancer; Holder of the first Doctorate in Kathak Classical Dance in the world; Attended High School in Indore and returned to settle since 1988.
 Rahat Indori, Urdu poet and songwriter in Hindi films
 Rais Khan (born 1938), Indian sitar maestro; born in Indore
 Salman Khan, (born 27-12-1965) Indian film actor; Famous bollywood actor; born in Indore
 Shubhangi Atre, Indian television actor, a lead role in Bhabhiji Ghar par hai, born and brought up in Indore
 Sneha Khanwalkar, Indian music director; works in Bollywood; was brought up in Indore
 Swanand Kirkire, lyricist-singer-writer, born in Indore
 Vijayendra Ghatge, actor in the Hindi film industry; studied at Daly College, son of Sita Raje Ghatge, who was the daughter of Maharaja Tukojirao Holkar III of Indore (reigned 1903–-1926)
 Zakir Khan, Stand-up comedian,
 Shahbaz Khan (actor), Television actor, known for his role in "Chandrakanta" as "Kunwar Virendra Singh"; Son of Ustad Amir Khan, born and raised in indore.
Mantra Well known RJ, Actor, Comedian; born and raised in Indore.

Sports persons and athletes
 Sandhya Agarwal, former captain of Indian women's cricket team
 Captain Syed Mushtaq Ali (1914–2005), Indian international cricketer; Colonel Nayudu's teammate in the Holkar team and in the Indian team; popularly known as the 'Errol Flynn' of Indian cricket; born and died in Indore
 Minoti Desai (born 1968), Indian cricketer, represented Indian women's team; born in Indore
 Rahul Dravid, Indian cricketer and former cricket captain; born in Indore
 Raj Singh Dungarpur, former president of the Board of Control for Cricket in India; former Indian cricket selector; ex-student of Daly College, Indore
 Narendra Hirwani, leg spin bowler and former member of Indian cricket team; moved to Indore as a teenager
 Sanjay Jagdale, former state cricketer; presently a national selectors for the senior all-India teams and the honorary secretary of the Madhya Pradesh Cricket Association; director of the Cricket Club of Indore
 Shankar Lakshman (1933–2006), goalkeeper of the Indian hockey team in the 1956, 1960 and 1964 Olympics and won two golds and a silver; captain of the team which won the gold in the 1966 Asian Games; belonged to Mhow and lived his retired life here until his death
 Colonel C.K. Nayudu, first Indian Test Captain in cricket; led India between 1932 and 1934
 Mir Ranjan Negi, hockey goalkeeper and coach of Indian women's team; won Asian Championship
 Naman Ojha, Indian wicket-keeper, stays and practices in Indore
 Chandu Sarwate, former Indian cricketer and former Indian cricket selector; lived and died in Indore in 2003
 Jalaj Saxena (born 1986), cricketer who plays as an all rounder for the India A cricket team; born in Indore
 Akshat Khamparia (born 1989),is an Indian chess International Master.He is the first player from Central India to hold an 'International Master' Title
 Arundhati Kirkire, born and brought up in Indore who played for the Indian women's cricket team.
 Venkatesh Iyer cricketer, played for Indian team for some months, born in Indore.
 Avesh Khan cricketer, born in Indore.
 Rajat Patidar cricketer, born in indore.

Academia, business, research and professionals
 Deepak Chaurasia, journalist, editor in chief of India News
 Seth Hukumchand,  He was known as the 'Cotton Prince of India' and had much credit even in some overseas countries.
 Ravi Salgia, translational thoracic oncologist, clinician/scientist, and academician
 Dr S Prakash Tiwari, Former Vice-Chancellor of S. K. Rajasthan Agricultural University, Bikaner, and Former Director of National Academy of Agricultural Research Management (NAARM), Hyderabad.
 Siddhartha Paul Tiwari, Academician and Researcher, UNESCO Chair on technology and sustainability

See also 
 List of people from Malwa

References

 
Indore
People from Indore